Chang Chen-yue (born 2 May 1974), also known as A-Yue and by his Amis name Ayal Komod, is an aboriginal Taiwanese rock and Hip-Hop musician, songwriter, singer and guitarist, and the frontman of his band, Free Night, also known as Free9. He is most widely known for his 1998 hit song "Ai Wo Bie Zou" (Love me, don't go). His 2013 album I am Ayal Komod  was awarded the Best Album Award during the 25th Golden Melody Awards.

Chang is a Taiwanese aborigine of the Amis people.

Life and career 
Chang was in the church choir as a child, which made him interested in music at a young age. He learnt to play the guitar in his middle school years and was gradually exposed to rock music.

Chang released his first album I Just Like You with labels Pony Canyon and Magic Stone in 1993 before following up with the album Have the Flowers Opened Yet?, with Taiwanese label Rock Records. Chang released his third and fourth albums This Afternoon is Very Boring (1997) and  Secret Base (1998) with Magic Stone. The song Love Me, Don't Go from Secret Base  was a massive hit in Mainland China and Taiwan. Both albums made the China Times Top 10 Albums list for 1998 and 1999 respectively. Chang crossed into Hip hop music in a collaboration with rapper MC HotDog in the song Wo Yao Qian from the album  Secret Base. Chang appeared in the 1998 film Connection by Fate, directed by Wan Jen, it was shown at the Venice Film Festival and won 
the FIPRESCI/NETPAC Award at The Singapore International Film Festival in 1999.

In December 2000, Chang released the album Trouble, it was awarded Top 10 Albums by Chinese Music Media Awards. He released albums Orange  and Orange 2  in April and July 2001 respectively, as well as changing his name to DJ Orange. Chang released his eighth album  One Of These Days with Rock Records in 2002. In 2004, Chang released the album Useless Guy which included a complication of his most popular songs as well as new songs Heaven, I Will Miss You, and Useless People. Chang founded his own record label True Color in 2004 and released his first extended play Drunk (2005) with the label. Chang released an additional EP Goodbye in July 2005 with Rock Records.

Chang released his ninth studio album OK in July 2007. For his album he was awarded as the eighth best mandarin male artist by chinese tabloid Southern Metropolis Daily. He collaborated with singer Tanya Chua in the hit song Missing You is a Type of Illness from the album. The song was written by Chang and singer-songwriter Chyi Chin. Chang also collaborated with fellow rapper MC HotDog and Taiwanese TV anchor Patty Hou on the song Small Star. In 2008, Chang created the band Superband along with Jonathan Lee, Wakin Chau, and Lo Ta-yu. The band's first EP North Bound  (2010), won the Jury Award at the 21st Golden Melody Awards.  In their second 2010 EP, Go South, the song Give Me My Own Song  was awarded as the Best Song of The Year at the 22nd Golden Melody Awards. They disbanded later that year after finishing all tours.

Chang released his 10th studio album I am Ayal Komod in July 2013. His album was awarded the Best Mandarin Album during the 25th Golden Melody Awards. In 2015, he joined the Hip-Hop band , with rapper MC HotDog, E-SO, and Xiao Chun. The band is known for their hit song "Fei Tai Yuan"(FLY OUT). In 2017, he appeared as one of the judges alongside Kris Wu, Will Pan, Jane Zhang, and GAI. in the rap competition show, The Rap of China. The show had reached 1.3 billion views in a little over a month. Chang reappeared as one of the judges for seasons 2 and 3 of the show from 2018-2019, but did not reappear for season 4. He released his fourth EP Gone Away  in October 2019.

Discography

Personal period

Studio album

EP

Featured

Filmography

Variety and reality show
2022:  Call Me by Fire (season 2) (披荊斬棘)

Awards and nominations

References

External links

1974 births
Amis people
Living people
Taiwanese Mandopop singers
Taiwanese rock musicians
Taiwanese male singer-songwriters
Taiwanese male film actors
People from Su'ao
20th-century Taiwanese male singers
21st-century Taiwanese male singers
Superband (band) members